Mike Tyson Heavyweight Boxing is a boxing video game developed by Atomic Planet Entertainment and published by Codemasters for the PlayStation 2 and Xbox in 2002. It is a sequel to Mike Tyson Boxing (2000) that was released for the PlayStation.

Reception

The game received "generally unfavorable reviews", according to the review aggregation website Metacritic.

References

External links
 

2002 video games
Atomic Planet Entertainment games
Boxing video games
Codemasters games
Cultural depictions of Mike Tyson
PlayStation 2 games
Video games based on real people
Xbox games
Video games developed in the United Kingdom